Kane Warren Hodder (born April 8, 1955) is an American actor, stuntman, and author.

Hodder is best known for his portrayal of Jason Voorhees in the Friday the 13th franchise, with four appearances in the film series: Friday the 13th Part VII: The New Blood, Friday the 13th Part VIII: Jason Takes Manhattan, Jason Goes to Hell: The Final Friday (in which he also played Freddy Krueger's clawed glove hand), and Jason X; and one in the video game Friday the 13th: The Game. He is also known for his role as Victor Crowley in the Hatchet series. He also played Leatherface during the stunts of Leatherface: The Texas Chainsaw Massacre III, The Texas Chainsaw Massacre III on a TV in Freddy Vs. Jason as a cameo, and the upcoming video game The Texas Chain Saw Massacre.

Early life, family and education
Hodder was born in Auburn, California in 1955.

Career
Early in his career during an interview, Hodder offered to show the interviewer and her cameraman a fire stunt. It went horribly wrong, leaving him with 2nd and 3rd degree burns over much of his upper body. It was because of these burns that he was initially selected to portray Freddy Krueger in A Nightmare on Elm Street, a role that would eventually go to Robert Englund with whom he formed a lifelong friendship. Hodder was the first actor to portray Jason Voorhees more than once, in a total of four consecutive movies from Friday the 13th Part VII: The New Blood to Jason X. He portrayed horror icon Leatherface through the stunt work of the 1990 film Leatherface: The Texas Chainsaw Massacre III and played Freddy Krueger's clawed glove hand at the ending scene of Jason Goes to Hell: The Final Friday. He also acted as a police guard in Jason Goes to Hell. He also appeared in an episode of The Arsenio Hall Show to promote Friday the 13th Part VIII: Jason Takes Manhattan, in costume as Jason.

Although he offered to reprise his role as Jason Voorhees in the 2003 film Freddy vs. Jason, director Ronny Yu replaced Hodder with  Canadian stuntman Ken Kirzinger. The switch created controversy among fans of the series and has been credited to several rumors, including Kirzinger's location in Canada and his height compared to Robert Englund, the actor who portrayed Freddy Krueger, while Yu himself stated that it was New Line Cinema's idea to do so. Though Hodder still expresses resentment over not being chosen, he is still good friends with Kirzinger and Englund. In 2011 Hodder wrote, along with author Michael Aloisi, his autobiography Unmasked: The True Story of the World's Most Prolific Cinematic Killer. This was in 2014 turned into a webseries, which was released as The Killer & I.

Hodder starred in the slasher film Hatchet as main character Victor Crowley, a physically deformed young boy who comes back from the dead to kill the people who invade the swamp where he lives— a similar story in relation to that of Jason Voorhees. The role earned him the Horror Jury Award for Best Actor at the Fantastic Fest in Austin, Texas. He  reprised this role in Hatchet II, Hatchet III and Victor Crowley.

Hodder portrayed Grawesome Crutal in the slasher film, Muck and its sequel Muck: Feast of Saint Patrick. He co-starred with Doug Jones and Michael McShane in the horror comedy film Love in the Time of Monsters. In March 2015, he was part of Adam Green's ArieScope webseries Adam Green's Scary Sleepover.

Kane Hodder reprised his role as Jason Voorhees in Friday the 13th: The Game.

Unmasked
Hodder co-wrote an autobiography with author Mike Aloisi. The book is about his life and experience in the film industry and was released on October 1, 2011.
<blockquote>Unmasked documents the unlikely true story of a boy who was taunted and beaten relentlessly by bullies throughout his childhood. Kane only escaped his tormentors when he moved to a tiny island in the South Pacific where he lived for all of his teen years. After living shirtless in a jungle for a while, he headed back to America where he fell in love with doing stunts—only to have his love burn him, literally. For the first time ever, Kane tells the true story of the burn injury that nearly killed him at the start of his career. The entire story of his recovery, the emotional and physical damage it caused, his fight to break back into the industry that almost killed him, and his rise to become a film actor are told in Kane's own voice.</blockquote>

Filmography

StuntsLone Wolf McQuade (1983)Hardbodies (1984)The Hills Have Eyes Part II (1985)House (1986)Avenging Force (1986)The Patriot (1986)House II: The Second Story (1987)Born to Race (1988)Prison (1988)Friday the 13th Part VII: The New Blood (1988)Waxwork (1988)DeepStar Six (1989)The Horror Show (1989)Friday the 13th Part VIII: Jason Takes Manhattan (1989)Leatherface: The Texas Chainsaw Massacre III (1990)9½ Ninjas! (1991)Out for Justice (1991)Dangerous Women (1991)Ghoulies III: Ghoulies Go to College (1991)The Rapture (1991)The Last Boy Scout (1991)House IV (1992)Double Trouble (1992)Waxwork II: Lost in Time (1992)Live! From Death Row (1992)Under Siege (1992)Jason Goes to Hell: The Final Friday (1993)Father Hood (1993)Demolition Man (1993)Younger & Younger (1993)The Secret World of Alex Mack (1994)A Low Down Dirty Shame (1994)Just Cause (1995)Project Metalbeast (1995)Four Rooms (1995)Seven (1995)Fair Game (1995)L.A. Heat (1996)The Big Fall (1996)Best of the Best 3: No Turning Back (1996)The Fan (1996)Marshal Law (1996)Brittle Glory (1997)Spawn (1997)Fire Down Below (1997)Team Knight Rider (1997)Most Wanted (1997)The Shooter (1997)The Underground (1997)Wishmaster (1997)
The Protector (1997)
The Shadow Men (1998)
Children of the Corn V: Fields of Terror (1998)
Black Thunder (1998)
A Night at the Roxbury (1998)
Enemy of the State (1998)
Hitman's Run (1999)
Robbers (2000)
Partners (2000)
Gone in 60 Seconds (2000)
Slackers (2002)
Monster (2003)
Daredevil (2003)
Freddy Vs. Jason (2003), Stunt for Leatherface in Texas Chainsaw Massacre III as a cameo on a television
The Devil's Rejects (2005)
Fallen Angels (2006; also Associate Producer)
Hatchet (2006)
Hack! (2007)
Ed Gein: The Butcher of Plainfield (2007)
Ghost Town (2008)
Hatchet II (2010)
Hatchet III (2013)
Friday the 13th: The Game (2017) (Video game motion capture choreography and stunts)
Victor Crowley (2017)
The Texas Chain Saw Massacre (2022) (Video game motion capture choreography and stunts)

Acting

 California Split (1974) as Reno Poker Player
 Alligator (1980) as Alligator (uncredited)
 Streets of Hollywood (1983) as Kane
 Lone Wolf McQuade (1983) as Goon (uncredited)
 Hardbodies (1984) as Older Geek
 City Limits (1984) as Unfriendly DA
 Avenging Force (1986) as Thug
 House II: The Second Story (1987) as Gorilla
 Open House (1987) as Trailer Narration (voice)
 Prison (1987) as Forsythe / Gas Mask Guard
 Friday the 13th Part VII: The New Blood (1988) as Jason Voorhees
 Waxwork (1988) as Frankenstein's Monster (uncredited)
 Trained to Kill (1989) as Body Guard
 Friday the 13th Part VIII: Jason Takes Manhattan (1989) as Jason Voorhees
 Best of the Best (1989) as Burt
 Ghoulies III: Ghoulies go to College (1991) as man in Rolling Mop Bucket (uncredited)
 9½ Ninjas! (1991) (uncredited)
 Alligator II: The Mutation (1991) as Billy Boy
 Out for Justice (1991) as Henchman at Party (uncredited)
 The Rapture (1991) as Security Guard (uncredited)
 Under Siege (1992) as Commando (uncredited)
 No Place to Hide (1993) as Weller
 House IV (1992) as The Human Pizza (uncredited)
 Best of the Best 2 (1993) as Backdoor Man
 Jason Goes to Hell: The Final Friday (1993) as Jason Voorhees / FBI guard at hospital #2 / Freddy Krueger's gloved hand
 Father Hood (1993) as Bus Driver (uncredited)
 Rubdown (1993, TV Movie) as Simon
 Pumpkinhead II: Blood Wings (1993) as Keith Knox
 The Adventures of Brisco County, Jr. (1994, TV Series) as Cop Near Bank Vault (uncredited)
 A Low Down Dirty Shame (1994) (uncredited)
 Scanner Cop II (1995) as Kidnapper #1
 Project Metalbeast (1995) as MetalBeast
 Steel Frontier (1995) as Kinton
 Best of the Best 3: No Turning Back (1995) as Neo-Nazi Gunman (uncredited)
 Fair Game (1995)
 Wildly Available (1996) as Driver
 The Big Fall (1996)
 The Protector (1997) as Guard Falling Down Stairs (uncredited)
 Wishmaster (1997) as Merritt's Guard
 T.N.T. (1997) as Townie #3
 The Shooter (1997) as Fighter (uncredited)
 Children of the Corn V: Fields of Terror (1998) as Bartender
 Watchers Reborn (1998) as Clerk
 V.I.P. (1998, TV Series) as Matthew Adair
 Nash Bridges (1998, TV Series) as Josh Denkirk (uncredited)
 Wildly Available (1999)
 L.A. Heat (1999)
 Geppetto (2000)
 Jason X (2001) as Jason Voorhees / Uber Jason
 Daredevil (2003) as Fallon's Bodyguard (uncredited)
 Charmed (2003, TV Series) as Thug at Pizza Place (uncredited)
 Dark Wolf (2003) as Biker Guy
 Grind (2003) as Sandy's Dad (uncredited)
 Monster (2003) as Undercover Cop
 Alias (2003, TV Series) as Lead Thug in Shanghai (uncredited)
 2001 Maniacs (2005) as Jason
 The Devil's Rejects (2005) as Officer with Gas Mask on Left (uncredited)
 Hatchet (2006) as Victor Crowley / Mr. Crowley
 Room 6 (2006) as Homeless Demon
 Behind the Mask: The Rise of Leslie Vernon (2006) as Guy at Elm Street House
 Fallen Angels (2006) as Envy
 Ed Gein: The Butcher of Plainfield (2007) as Ed Gein
 Hack! (2007) as First Victim
 Dead Noon (2007) as Undead Cowboy
 Born (2007) as Asmodeus / Cardinal
 B.T.K. (2008) as Dennis Rader
 Black Friday (2008)
 His Name Was Jason: 30 Years of Friday the 13th (2009, TV Movie documentary) as himself
 Monsterpiece Theatre Volume 1 (2009)
 Old Habits Die Hard (2009) as Jonah
 Bundy: A Legacy of Evil (2009) as Warden
 Fear Clinic (2009, TV Series) as Villatoro
 Stingy Jack (2009)
 Frozen (2010) as Cody
 Hatchet II (2010) as Victor Crowley / Thomas Crowley
 Never Sleep Again: The Elm Street Legacy (2010) as himself
 Black Friday 3D (2010)
 The Afflicted (2011) as Hank
 Exit 33 (2011) as Ike
 Chillerama (2011) as Meshugannah (segment "The Diary Of Anne Frankenstein")
 The Family (2011) as Stone
 Monsterpiece Theatre Volume II (2011) as Milo (segment "Moonlighting")
 Robin Hood: Ghosts of Sherwood (2012) as Little John
 Among Friends (2012) as Limo Driver
 Holliston (2012-2013, TV Series) as himself
 Hatchet III (2013) as Victor Crowley
 Crystal Lake Memories: The Complete History of Friday the 13th (2013, TV Movie documentary) as himself
 Exit to Hell (2013) as Sickle
 Love in the Time of Monsters (2014) as Lou
 Digging up The Marrow (2014) as himself
 Alice D (2014) as Sr. Davenport
 Abandoned in the Dark (2014) as Hutchinson
 Fury: The Tales of Ronan Pierce (2014) as Eddie White
 Charlie's Farm (2014) as Tony Stewart
 Muck (2015) as Grawesome Crutal
 Old 37 (2015) as Jon Roy
 Tag (2015) as Tom
 Almost Mercy (2015) as Coach Elwood
 Smothered (2016) as Striper
 Chainsaw Maidens (2016) as Angel of Death
 Check Point (2017) as Cyris
 Friday the 13th: The Game (2017, Video Game) as Jason Voorhees / Roy Burns (Motion capture choreography and stunts)
 Victor Crowley (2017) as Victor Crowley
 Death House (2017) as Sieg
 An Accidental Zombie (Named Ted) (2017) as Frank Lee
 Shed of the Dead (2019) as Mr. Parsons
 Paralyzed with Fear (2019) as Chemock
 Tabbott's Traveling Carnivale of Terrors (2019) as Victor: The Butcher
 Impractical Jokers: The Movie (2020) as Bodyguard (uncredited)
 Stay Home (2020) as Kane
 Room 9 (2021) as Beau Johnson
 13 Fanboy (2021) as himself
 Knifecorp (2021) as Angus Finn
 Tow (2022) as The Mechanic
 Dead by Midnight (Y2Kill) (2022) as Kane Hodder
 Jasper (2022) as Jasper Davidson
 Kill Her Goats (2023) as Goatface
 Room 9 Part 2: They Turned Us Into Killers (upcoming) as Beau Johnson
 Wickedy Ally (upcoming) as Captain Charles Black
 The Pick Up (upcoming) as Bill
 Our Social Playground (upcoming) as Craig Garrington
 Iron Lung (upcoming) as Iron Lung
 Dr Frankenstein's Journal (upcoming) as Aaron Kosminski
 Devotion (upcoming) as Tank
 Dawn of 5 Evils (upcoming) 
 Beaten Path (upcoming)
 Witchula (upcoming) as Elias Lou Warren
 Room and Board (upcoming)
 The Texas Chain Saw Massacre (upcoming video game) as Leatherface (Motion capture choreography and stunts)

Himself 
 To Hell and Back: The Kane Hodder Story (2018)
 In Search of Darkness (2019)
 In Search of Darkness: Part II (2020)
 Impractical Jokers: Dinner Party (2020)

Personal life

Hodder is an avid poker player. He has the word "Kill!" tattooed on the back of his bottom lip. He spends time working with children in burn centers, and despite the roles he often plays, Hodder has often been described as a very friendly man who loves to meet his fans.

For a long time, Hodder claimed his favorite kill scene in his films was the "sleeping bag against a tree" scene from Friday the 13th Part VII: The New Blood. He now considers the one where he rips a woman's face in half from Hatchet (2006) to be his favorite.

Hodder is a noted Juggalo, a fan of the group Insane Clown Posse. To reflect this, he has a custom charm of the group's "hatchetman" logo holding a machete instead of a hatchet, a reference to his role as Jason.

Hodder appeared on the December 4, 2012 episode of the TruTV show Hardcore Pawn, in which he had a miniature gold mask made from a piece a fan had made for him.

Along with poker Hodder is also an avid ghost hunter. He founded the Hollywood Ghost Hunters group with former stuntman and friend Rick "Stuntman" McCullum who was a stunt double for Sid Haig.

In 1984, he married his wife Susan B. Hodder and has two sons name Jace Hodder and Reed Hodder.

References

External links

Kane Hodder: To Hell and Back - Official Trailer.

1955 births
20th-century American male actors
21st-century American male actors
Male actors from California
American male film actors
American poker players
American stunt performers
American male video game actors
Living people
People from Auburn, California